Robert of Saint-Omer (+1617) was a Flemish noble lord who became 1st Count of Morbecque and 1st Baron of Robecq.

Family 
He was born in the family of Saint-Omer, only son of John of Saint-Omer, lord of Morbecque and Madeleine de la Tramerie. He married Anne of Croy, but they died without heirs. He was succeeded by his niece, who married Louis of Montmorency. He died in his castle and was buried in the church of Morbecque.

Functions 
In his honour the archdukes allowed him to elevate Morbecque in a county by decree of 8 February 1614. However he was the last member of his family to possess the rights of Robecque. Since then the house of Montmorency took possession of Robecq

References

Saint-Omer family
Nobility of the Spanish Netherlands